MPHS may refer to:

 Miller Place High School, Miller Place, New York
 Manlius Pebble Hill School, DeWitt, New York
 Marysville Pilchuck High School, Marysville, Washington, United States
 May Pen High School, Clarendon, Jamaica
 Memorial Private High School, Houston, Texas
 Mount Pleasant High School (disambiguation)
 Mountain Pointe High School, Phoenix, Arizona, United States
 Myers Park High School, Charlotte, North Carolina, United States
 Myrtle Point High School, Myrtle Point, Oregon, United States
 Hulu Selangor Municipal Council (MPHS)

See also 
 MPH (disambiguation)

Mother's Pride High School